Fernando Evangelista Iglesias (born 21 October 1991) is an Argentine professional footballer who plays as a left-back for Quilmes.

Career
Evangelista started in the youth ranks of Deportivo MacAllister, before joining Boca Juniors at the age of fourteen. After seven years in the youth of Boca, Evangelista made his professional debut on 25 August 2012 in an Argentine Primera División match against Unión Santa Fe. Another appearance for Boca came against Colón on 11 November. Ahead of the 2013–14 Primera B Nacional season, Evangelista joined Unión Santa Fe on loan for the season. He went onto make twenty-five appearances for Unión. In July 2014, Evangelista joined Primera B Nacional side Atlético Tucumán in a two-season loan deal.

He made his debut for the club on 10 August 2014 in a 1–0 win against Crucero del Norte. He played twenty-seven times for Atlético Tucumán during the 2014 and 2015 Primera B Nacional seasons, fifteen of those games came during Atlético Tucumán's promotion-winning campaign of 2015. On 6 January 2016, Evangelista extended his loan spell with Atlético Tucumán for a further eighteen months until the end of the 2016–17 Argentine Primera División season. He returned to Boca for the 2017–18 campaign and featured twice before leaving the club to join Newell's Old Boys. Eleven total appearances followed for them.

On 5 July 2018, Evangelista was signed by Estudiantes. He appeared six times for the La Plata outfit, the last of which came on 3 March 2019 versus Racing Club. In the succeeding June, Evangelista agreed to join fellow Primera División team Aldosivi. He then had a spell at Estudiantes de Buenos Aires, before joining Quilmes in January 2022.

Career statistics
.

Honours
Atlético Tucumán
Primera B Nacional: 2015

References

External links

1991 births
Living people
People from Santa Rosa, La Pampa
Argentine footballers
Association football defenders
Argentine Primera División players
Primera Nacional players
Boca Juniors footballers
Unión de Santa Fe footballers
Atlético Tucumán footballers
Newell's Old Boys footballers
Estudiantes de La Plata footballers
Aldosivi footballers
Estudiantes de Buenos Aires footballers
Quilmes Atlético Club footballers